The Regulation of Railways Act 1868 is an Act of the Parliament of the United Kingdom. It is one of the Railway Regulation Acts 1840 to 1893. 

It was enacted following the first murder on the railways, that of Thomas Briggs by Franz Muller near Hackney in 1864. 

The Act made new provisions for:

 ensuring a method was available for allowing passengers to communicate with the train's guard, if the train was scheduled to travel more than 20 miles without stopping; 
 establishing a fine for passengers raising the alarm without due cause (warnings of this fact still routinely appear near train emergency alarms);
 removing trees near railway lines that might fall and block the train;
 a penalty for trespassing on the railway.

Despite the legislation, it was not until 1899 that internal emergency wires came to be used on the majority of trains.

The Act also made provision for the construction and working of a railway as a light railway, 'subject to such conditions and regulations as the Board of Trade may from time to time impose or make'. Section 28 of the Act laid down maximum permitted axle weights and specified that 'the regulations respecting the speed of trains shall not authorize a rate of speed exceeding at any time twenty-five miles an hour'. The Light Railways Act 1896 subsequently introduced more comprehensive legislation governing light railways.

References

Railway Acts
United Kingdom Acts of Parliament 1868
1868 in rail transport

pt:Regulation of Railways Act 1868